The Bachelor Australia is a reality television adaptation of the U.S. series of the same name. The series, hosted by Osher Günsberg, first premiered on Network 10 on 8 September 2013. Its success resulted in spin-offs The Bachelorette Australia and Bachelor in Paradise Australia.

It was announced in November 2015 that unlike seasons 1–3 which were produced by Shine Australia, seasons 4–present would be produced by Warner Bros. International Television Production.

On 2 April 2022 it was announced that, unlike all previous seasons, season 10 would be filmed in Queensland on the Gold Coast and on 23 May 2022 it was also revealed that, in a global franchise first, the season would have three bachelors.

Premise
The series focuses on a single bachelor and a pool of romantic interests. The conflicts in the series, both internal and external, stem from the elimination-style format of the show. Early in the season, the bachelor goes on large group dates with the women, with the majority of women eliminated during rose ceremonies. As the season progresses, women are also eliminated on single dates, elimination two-on-one dates and in cocktail parties. The process culminates with hometown visits to the families of the final four women, overnight dates, should they choose to accept, at exotic locations with the final three women, and interaction with the bachelor's family with the final two women. In some cases, the bachelor proposes to his final selection.

All seasons of the show have been heterosexual-centric (a male seeking a female partner), however, a bisexual edition of sister series, The Bachelorette has set a precedent that The Bachelor may include editions of the show that focus on different sexual orientations.

Elimination process

Single Date
The bachelor and one woman go on a date. The bachelor is given a chance to get to know the woman on a more personal level, and the dates are usually very intimate. If the date goes well and the bachelor wishes to spend more time with the woman or get to know them further, he may present them with a rose at the date. This means that during the rose ceremony at the end of each episode, she will be safe and there will be no chance of her going home.

Group Date
The bachelor and a group of women participate in an activity. Sometimes the activity takes the form of a competition, with the winner or winners spending more time with the bachelor. The bachelor typically presents a rose to the woman who makes the best impression during the group date.

Rose Ceremony
The women who have not been eliminated stand in rows at one end of the room, and the bachelor faces them. The bachelor has a tray with roses.
The bachelor takes a rose and calls a woman by name. The woman steps forward, and the bachelor asks, "Will you accept this rose?" The woman accepts, takes the rose, and makes her way to the other side of the room (where all the women who have been given a rose are required to stand.)
When there is one rose remaining, host Osher Günsberg tells the bachelor, "When you're ready."
After all roses are distributed, the host tells the women who did not receive a rose to "please take some time to say goodbye."

Hometown Visits
The bachelor visits the home towns and families of each of the four remaining women. At the rose ceremony, one woman is eliminated, leaving three. Another episode airs before the final rose ceremony, leaving two women.

The Finale
The two remaining women separately meet with the bachelor's family. At the end of the episode, the bachelor will reveal their true love to the woman of his choice and will often propose to her. That woman is said to be the winner of The Bachelor.

Seasons

Ratings

Criticism
The show has been subjected to allegations of sexism, in relation to its hyper-sexualised and stereotypical portrayal of women. This feminist reading of the show has prompted an ironic following, which has also manifested online through humorous columns and episode reviews.

Spin-offs
On 14 November 2014, it was announced that Network Ten had commissioned the spin-off series The Bachelorette Australia. It was revealed that Network Ten were exploring launching local adaptations of some of the Bachelor spin-off programs including After the Rose, Bachelor Pad. In October 2017, Network Ten officially confirmed that a local adaptation of Bachelor in Paradise Australia will go into production and the first season premiered in 2018.

Broadcast
In New Zealand, The Bachelor airs on Bravo TV under the title The Bachelor Australia.

References

2013 Australian television series debuts
2010s Australian reality television series
Australian dating and relationship reality television series
English-language television shows
Network 10 original programming
Television shows set in New South Wales
Television series by Endemol Australia
Television series by Warner Bros. Television Studios
Australian TV series
Australian television series based on American television series
2020s Australian reality television series